Hubie Halloween is a 2020 American mystery horror comedy film directed by Steve Brill, co-written by Tim Herlihy and Adam Sandler, who also stars in the title role, and co-starring an ensemble supporting cast consisting of Kevin James, Julie Bowen, Ray Liotta, Rob Schneider, June Squibb, Kenan Thompson, Shaquille O'Neal, Steve Buscemi, and Maya Rudolph. The film follows a Halloween-loving delicatessen worker who must save the town of Salem, Massachusetts, from a kidnapper.

Released on October 7, 2020, by Netflix, the film received mixed reviews from critics, although some critics considered it better than Sandler's other recent comedies. The film pays tribute to actor Cameron Boyce, who was set to co-star but died in 2019.

Plot
Hubie Dubois is a dimwitted delicatessen employee in Salem, Massachusetts who is ridiculed by almost the entire city, and is the butt of many practical jokes. His antics have annoyed police sergeants Steve Downey and Blake, and Father Dave, a priest. Hubie spends his time during Halloween monitoring the city as the official Halloween Helper.

The day before Halloween, Hubie meets his strange new neighbor Walter Lambert, and news spreads around town about Richie Hartman, a convict and childhood friend of Hubie who has absconded from a local mental institution.

The next day is Halloween; Hubie is working as Halloween Monitor and investigates Walter's home after reports of strange noises. Having reported this to the police, he is "recruited" by Downey as an "AUU" (auxiliary undercover unit). Hubie believes this assignment is genuine, but it is really just something Steve tells Hubie in hopes it will deter Hubie from bothering him.

Hubie goes to a local Halloween party to monitor the activities. However, it soon turns sour. Hubie is tricked into going into a corn maze following reports about a lost child. Hubie's young co-worker Mike follows hoping to scare Hubie. Hubie finds Mike and sees him getting pulled into the maze and then disappearing.
 
Hubie moves his attention to monitoring a drive-in cinema. Hubie's old classmates Lester and Mary Hennessey scare Hubie after false reports of suspicious activity in one of the cars at the drive-in (who turn out to be trick-or-treaters driven by Mr. Hennessey to throw eggs at Hubie). He flees into the woods and finds Walter. Walter thinks he is turning into a werewolf and chases Hubie to a haunted house in a fun fair that is overseen by Chantal Taylor.

Mr. and Mrs. Hennessey are kidnapped and Sgt. Downey is alerted. At the haunted house, Hubie sees a Siberian Husky, thinking it is Walter in his final form. The Husky then runs into the haunted house and Hubie chases it inside. It is eventually shown that the Husky is Miss Taylor's pet dog Buster. Pete Landolfa goes in to scare Hubie, but is kidnapped in front of him. Sgt. Downey arrives and suggests to Mayor Benson that they cancel Halloween. Hubie thinks it is Walter, but then Blake calls Downey stating that Walter is at the police station with Richie who had turned themselves in, who also reveals that Walter's real name is Nick Hudson. Richie had escaped, bringing Walter back to the mental institution which they refer to as the werewolf treatment center. Downey, Benson, and Dave agree that Hubie is the kidnapper, thinking he is getting revenge on his bullies. He runs away and goes to a radio station.

DJ Aurora tells Hubie that someone calls a lot more than him always requesting a song for Hubie. They all think Sgt. Downey's ex-wife Violet Valentine is the caller. The burner phone that was planted when called is revealed to be in Hubie's house and he races there, hoping his mother is okay. It is revealed that Hubie's mother kidnapped Pete, Mike, and the Hennesseys as revenge for tormenting Hubie and plans to burn them alive. He rescues them just as the police, the news media, Nick, and Richie arrive, but they are still ungrateful. His mother then scolds Pete, Mike, and the Hennesseys for all the things they did to Hubie and they also admitted that they were jealous of him for various reasons. Hubie's mother suddenly disappears upon using the Frankenstein trick.

One year later, Hubie is married to Violet, is the new Mayor of Salem, and his new foster kids are going trick or treating dressed like people he knows. Having earned respect from the locals, Hubie goes into town on his bicycle with Downey escorting him and prepares for the Halloween festivities.

Cast

 Adam Sandler as Hubie Dubois, a delicatessen employee.
 Kevin James as Sgt. Steve Downey, a police sergeant constantly bothered by Hubie.
 Julie Bowen as Violet Valentine, Hubie's love interest, later wife and Sgt. Downey's ex-wife.
 Ray Liotta as Pete Landolfa, a rude man who recently lost his father and is one of Hubie's tormentors.
 Rob Schneider as Richie Hartman, Hubie's childhood friend and a convict with severe bladder issues who escaped from a mental institution to get his roommate back there before he gets into trouble.
 June Squibb as Mrs. Dubois, Hubie's mother
 Kenan Thompson as Sgt. Blake, a police sergeant working under Steve Downey.
 Shaquille O'Neal as DJ Aurora, a radio host with a feminine voice.
 Vivian Nixon as the voice of DJ Aurora
 Steve Buscemi as "Walter Lambert" / Nick Hudson, Hubie's new neighbor who believes himself to be a 359-year-old werewolf.
 Maya Rudolph as Mary Hennessey, one of Hubie's old classmates who often pranks him.
 Michael Chiklis as Father Dave, Salem's resident preacher who is often annoyed with Hubie's antics.
 Tim Meadows as Lester Hennessey, Mary's husband and one of Hubie's old classmates who assists his wife in pranking Hubie. Meadows had to wear a full bald cap to make himself look completely bald.
 Karan Brar as Mike Mundi, Hubie's teenage co-worker who often torments Hubie.
 George Wallace as Mayor Benson, the Mayor of Salem.
 Paris Berelc as Megan McNally, a girl who is Tommy's dream girl.
 Noah Schnapp as Tommy, Violet's foster son.
 China Anne McClain as Chantal Taylor, an elementary school teacher who owns a Siberian Husky named Buster.
 Colin Quinn as a janitor.
 Kym Whitley as Louise, a local farmer and Dave's wife.
 Lavell Crawford as Dave, a local farmer and Louise's husband.
 Mikey Day as Axehead, a haunted house employee alongside Peggy.
 Blake Clark as Tayback, a cook.
 Tyler Crumley as Adam O'Doyle, a boy who frequently bullies Hubie with his friends.

Additionally,  Peyton List appears as Peggy, a haunted house employee trying to raise money for her school. Ben Stiller reprises his role as Hal L., an orderly at Richie and Nick's asylum who previously appeared in Happy Gilmore. Dan Patrick plays the principal of the local elementary school. Melissa Villaseñor plays Karen, a cat owner in Hubie's neighborhood. WHDH morning anchor Alaina Pinto plays Salem's resident news anchor. Betsy Sodaro plays Bunny, Aurora's wife with a masculine voice provided by an uncredited actor. Kelli Berglund, Kevin Quinn, Bradley Steven Perry, Lilimar, and Amber Frank play teenager characters the Billie Eilish Girl, Pennywise Guy, Cormac, Coco, and a Female Zombie Band Singer, respectively. Sandler's wife Jackie plays Tracy Phillips, a local news reporter, while their children Sadie and Sunny play Violet's foster daughters Danielle and Cooky. Sandler's nephew, Jared plays a Male Zombie Band Singer. Screenwriter Tim Herlihy plays a Wild Bear, while his son Martin plays a Teenage Zombie. Director Steve Brill's children Nathan and Ethan play two Food Fight Kids. Producer Allen Covert plays a Zombie Movie Dad while his kids Hannah, Abigail, Rebecca, and Hank play Danielle and Cooky's friends and two Food Fight Kids. Kevin James' children appear sporadically throughout the film: Kannon plays "Exorcist Costume Kid" while Sienna, Shea and Sistine play more of Danielle and Cooky's friends. Ben Stiller and Ray Liotta's daughters Ella Olivia and Karsen play teenagers Lexie and Barb, respectively.

Production
In July 2019, Hubie Halloween was announced as Adam Sandler's next film as part of his Netflix deal, with Happy Madison regulars Kevin James, Julie Bowen, Maya Rudolph, Steve Buscemi, Rob Schneider, Tim Meadows, Colin Quinn, Blake Clark and Shaquille O'Neal as part of the cast. Ray Liotta, Michael Chiklis, Kenan Thompson, Peyton List, China Anne McClain, Paris Berelc, June Squibb, Noah Schnapp, Mikey Day, Melissa Villaseñor, Kym Whitley, Lavell Crawford, Betsy Sodaro, and George Wallace were also attached, with Steve Brill directing from a screenplay by Sandler and Tim Herlihy. Cameron Boyce, who had starred alongside Sandler in the Grown Ups series, was set to feature in the film, but died in July 2019 from complications of epilepsy just days before shooting. Boyce's best friend and former Jessie co-star Karan Brar was then recast in his role. The film is dedicated in Boyce's memory.

Principal photography began in July 2019 around Salem, Lynnfield, Hamilton, Marblehead, Danvers and other parts of Massachusetts, wrapping in early September.

Release 
Hubie Halloween was digitally released by Netflix on October 7, 2020. It was the top-streamed title in its first two weeks of release. It finished third in its third weekend, then over Halloween weekend placed sixth.

Reception 
The website's critics consensus reads "Viewers immune to its star's charms won't find it much of a treat, but Hubie Halloween is sweet enough to satisfy fans of Adam Sandler's antics." On Metacritic it has a weighted average score of 53 out of 100, based on reviews from 19 critics, indicating "mixed or average reviews".
 
David Ehrlich of IndieWire gave the film a "B–," praising the cameos and saying, "Are those details enough to make Hubie Halloween much better than all the other content Sandler has churned out for Netflix so far, or am I just drunk on the movie's pumpkin-spiced production design? It's hard to say, but this is the first time in a long time that it feels nice to watch the Sandman goof off with his friends for 90 minutes."

For the 41st Golden Raspberry Awards, Hubie Halloween received three nominations for Worst Actor (for Sandler), Worst Screen Combo (for "Sandler and His Grating Simpleton Voice"), and Worst Prequel, Remake, Rip-off or Sequel (for a "Remake/Rip-Off of Ernest Scared Stupid").

Accolades

References

External links
 
 

2020 comedy horror films
American comedy horror films
Comedy crossover films
2020s English-language films
Films about bullying
American films about Halloween
Halloween horror films
Films directed by Steven Brill
Films produced by Adam Sandler
Films produced by Allen Covert
Films scored by Rupert Gregson-Williams
Films set in 2020
Films set in 2021
Films set in Massachusetts
Films shot in Massachusetts
American comedy mystery films
American mystery horror films
Films with screenplays by Adam Sandler
Films with screenplays by Tim Herlihy
Happy Madison Productions films
English-language Netflix original films
2020s American films